The Long Beach Main Post Office is a post office building located on Long Beach Boulevard in downtown Long Beach, California.

The Art Deco and PWA Moderne style building opened in 1934 and was added to the National Register of Historic Places (as U.S. Post Office-Long Beach Main) due to its architectural significance in 1985.  It remains in operation as a post office.

Description
The structure was built from 1932 to 1934, out of large masonry blocks with terra cotta sheathing.  The structure's most prominent feature is the central tower rising four-and-a-half stories from the street level.  The building's design has been credited to Louis A. Simon and the Office of the Supervising Architect under James A. Wetmore.  From 1933 to 1939, Simon was the head of the Office of the Supervising Architect, an agency of the United States Treasury Department that designed federal government buildings.

The building's architectural style has been described as "Starved Classicism" and "PWA Moderne".  One writer has referred to the building as "Post-Quake Moderne," due to the fact that the Moderne style of Art Deco architecture was prevalent as Long Beach was rebuilt after the 1933 Long Beach earthquake. In their book, "An architectural guidebook to Los Angeles," architectural historians David Gebhard and Robert Winter described the Long Beach Main Post Office as "PWA Moderne, accomplished with restrained and sophisticated taste."

History

Long Beach's postal system was established in 1885, predating the city's official incorporation. The first postmaster was Col. W.W. Lowe.

The proposal for the new main post office building was officially accepted in March 1931, and the groundbreaking took place one year later in March 1932.  Construction was underway when the 1933 Long Beach earthquake struck the city.  Construction was halted briefly, but work resumed a week later after a survey by contractors showed little damage.  The scaffolding was removed from the structure at the end of July 1934, and 5,000 persons attended the opening ceremony in September 1934.   The structure has been in continuous operation as a post office since 1934.

Gallery

See also 

 List of City of Long Beach historic landmarks
 National Register of Historic Places listings in Los Angeles County, California
 List of United States post offices

References

External links

Buildings and structures in Long Beach, California
Downtown Long Beach
Post office buildings in California
Government buildings completed in 1934
Long Beach
Long Beach
1934 establishments in California
1930s architecture in the United States
Art Deco architecture in California
PWA Moderne architecture in California